Mcqueenoceras is an extinct genus of early endocerid, a nautiloid from the Floian epoch of the late early Ordovician period. It was similar in overall form to Clitendoceras, from which it may have been derived. Mcqueenoceras, like Clitendoceras, has ventral siphuncle but the endocones are thicker on the ventral side and thinner on the dorsal. Also the sutures in Mcqueenoceras retreat rearward, forming lobes as they cross the venter. The type species is Mcqueenoceras jeffersonense, named by E.O. Ulrich and A.F. Foerste in 1935, and it is known from Missouri and New York. In 1956, Rousseau H. Flower named two other species, M. cariniferum and M. ventrale, both known from Maryland.

References 

Flower, R. H. 1964; Memoir 12, The Nautiloid Order Ellesmeroceratida (Cephalopoda), pp 126, 147, 148. NMBM&MR, Socorro N.M.
Teichert, C, 1964, Mcqueenoceras, p 166 in Proterocameroceratidae, pp 166–170 in the Treatise on Invertebrate Paleontology, Vol K. GSA and Univ Kansas Press.

Nautiloids
Prehistoric nautiloid genera
Ordovician cephalopods of North America